Olav Kjetilson Nylund (25 February 1903 – 1 November 1957) was a Norwegian politician for the Labour Party.

He was elected to the Norwegian Parliament from Aust-Agder in 1945, and was re-elected on one occasion.

Born in Åmli, he was a member of Åmli municipal council from 1931 to 1957, serving as deputy mayor in 1947–1951 and mayor from 1934 to 1940. He was also a member of Aust-Agder county council from 1934 to 1946.

Outside politics he worked as a manual laborer, mainly in farming. He chaired the regional branch of the Norwegian Farmers and Smallholders Union from 1951 to 1957.

References

1903 births
1957 deaths
Members of the Storting
Mayors of places in Aust-Agder
Labour Party (Norway) politicians
20th-century Norwegian politicians
People from Åmli